Ujaalaa Raasthaa is a Maldivian television series developed for Television Maldives in association with UNFPA. Directed by Mohamed Shareef and Muawiyath Anwar, the series narrates the journey of two best friends in three generations. The series developed as an attempt to aware the audience on several social issues, was widely accepted by the audience and received positive reviews from critics.

Cast

Main
 Zeenath Abbas as Ameena Adam
 Ahmed Saeed as Afsal
 Ali Shameel as Adamfulhu
 Hussain Nooradeen as Khalid
 Thahumeena Rasheed as Zuleikha
 Ahmed Asim as Majid
 Ahmed Azmeel as Adheel
 Chilhiya Moosa Manik as Basheer
 Hassan Afeef as Hussain Manik
 Aminath Rasheedha as Sobira; Afsal's mother
 Hawwa Sana as child Ameena Adam
 Naza Adam as child Sithura

Recurring
 Mariyam Suza as young Ameena Adam
 Nazeema as young Sithura
 Mariyam Zuhura as Wadheefa; Adamfulhu's daughter
 Abdulla Muaz as Asim
 Aminath Shareef as Nadhira
 Ismail Shifan
 Yaameen Rasheed
 Abdul Shamaam
 Shareefa Moosa
 Fathimath Nazeeha
 Fathimath Latha
 Fathimath Arifa
 Rilwan Rasheed
 Ahmed Shuhad
 Ibrahim Manik
 Abdul Rahman Ibrahim

Guest
 Sameema as Asma; Adamfulhu's wife

Episodes

Reception
Upon release, the series was met with positive reviews from critics, for the director and screenwriters work to present several moral values in an attractive way and touching several taboo topics for a mainstream release including, mensuration, sexual abuse within family, domestic abuse by husband, gender inequality and discrimination to name a few. Having similarities with the anthology series Vaisoori, directed by Arifa Ibrahim and released in 2003, the series was included in the "must watch television productions" in Maldives.

References

Serial drama television series
Maldivian television shows